Yingzhou may refer to:

Yingzhou District (颍州区) in Fuyang, Anhui, China
Yingzhou Subdistrict (瀛洲街道) in Taijiang District, Fuzhou, Fujian, China
Yingzhoulu (瀛州) a subdistrict (a former town) in Hejian, Cangzhou, Hebei, China
Yingzhou (瀛洲), a Chinese mythological island in Mount Penglai where immortals live
Yingzhou Ecological Park (瀛洲生态公园) in Guangzhou, Guangdong, China

Towns
Yingzhou, Jixi County (瀛洲) in Jixi County, Anhui, China
Yingzhou, Hainan (英州) in Lingshui Li Autonomous County, Hainan, China
Yingzhou, Hebei (瀛州), a former town in Hejian, Cangzhou, Hebei, China

Historical prefectures
Ying Prefecture (Anhui) (潁州), a prefecture between the 6th and 20th centuries in modern Anhui, China
Ying Prefecture (Shanxi) (應州), a prefecture between the 9th and 20th centuries in modern Shanxi, China
Ying Prefecture (Hubei) (郢州), a prefecture between the 6th and 13th centuries in modern Hubei, China
Ying Prefecture (Hebei) (瀛州), a prefecture between the 5th and 12th centuries in modern Hebei, China
Ying Prefecture (Liaoning) (營州), a prefecture between the 6th and 10th centuries in modern Liaoning, China
Ying Prefecture (Guangdong) (英州), a prefecture between the 10th and 12th centuries in modern Guangdong, China

See also
Yingzhoulu (瀛州路), a subdistrict in Hejian, Cangzhou, Hebei, China
Ying (disambiguation)
Ying Zhou (disambiguation)